The Nature of the Beast is the ninth studio album by Canadian rock band April Wine, released in 1981. The album was recorded at Le Manoir Studios, in the village of Shipton-on-Cherwell, in Oxfordshire, England following the band's 1980 European tour. This album was April Wine's commercial peak, certified Platinum in the US and reaching #24 on the Billboard 200 album chart.

"Just Between You and Me" became April Wine's most successful single, reaching #21 on the Billboard Hot 100 singles chart, #11 on Billboard's Top Tracks chart, and #22 on the Canadian RPM charts.

April Wine's version of the Lorence Hud song "Sign of the Gypsy Queen" also became a moderate hit, reaching #57 on the Billboard Hot 100, #19 on the Top Tracks chart, and #40 in Canada. Hud's original version of the song had also been a hit single in Canada in 1972 (#16 RPM charts).

The first track on the album, "All Over Town" also received airplay on album-oriented rock radio stations, charting at #29 on the Top Tracks chart.

Their Tenth track on the album "Bad Boys" was used in the First Episode of the twelve season of Supernatural, Recapping the events of the previous season.

Track listing

Personnel 
 Myles Goodwyn – vocals, guitars, keyboards
 Brian Greenway – vocals, guitars
 Gary Moffet – guitars, background vocals
 Steve Lang – bass, background vocals
 Jerry Mercer – drums

References 

April Wine albums
1981 albums
Aquarius Records (Canada) albums
Capitol Records albums
EMI Records albums
Albums produced by Mike Stone (record producer)
Albums produced by Myles Goodwyn